This is a list of famous Aragonese people. It includes people from the medieval Kingdom of Aragon or from contemporary Aragon, one of the Autonomous Communities of Spain and people born elsewhere with significant Aragonese ancestry.

Artists

 Francisco Goya (1746–1828), painter and printmaker
 Antonio Saura (1930–1998), painter
 Carlos Ezquerra (1947–2018), comic artist and creator of Judge Dredd

Filmmakers
 Segundo de Chomón (1871–1929), one of the first directors and SFX experts in film history
 Florián Rey (1894–1962), filmmaker
 Luis Buñuel (1900–1983), filmmaker
 Carlos Saura (1932–2023), filmmaker

Kings

 Alfonso the Battler (1073/4–1134), king of Aragon and Navarre
 James I of Aragon (1208–1276), king of Aragon, he expanded the Crown of Aragon into Valencia, Languedoc and the Balearic Islands.
 Peter III the Great (1239–1285), king of Aragon, conquered Sicily and Malta
 Ferdinand II of Aragon (1452–1516), king of Aragon, married Isabella of Castile and conquered the Kingdom of Navarre

Musicians

 Miguel Fleta (1897–1938), tenor
 Pilar Lorengar (1929–1996), soprano
 José Antonio Labordeta (1935–2010), singer-songwriter and political figure
 Enrique Bunbury (born 1967), rock singer-songwriter
 Eva Amaral (born 1973), pop singer-songwriter
 Joan Manuel Serrat (born 1943), singer-songwriter of Aragonese ascendance
 David Civera (born 1979),  singer
 Santiago Auserón (born 1954) ex-singer of Radio Futura, one of the most popular pop bands in Spain during the 1980s and early 1990s

Politicians
 Joaquin Costa (1846–1911), politician and thinker of the Generation of '98
 Francisco Ascaso (1901–1936), anarcho-syndicalist
 Joaquín Maurín (1896–1973), communist revolutionary
 Josep Antoni Duran i Lleida (born 1952), Catalan politician born in Aragón
 Juan Alberto Belloch (born 1950), Spanish interior minister and mayor of Zaragoza
 Antonio Perez (1539–1611), secretary of king Philip II of Spain
 Pedro Pablo Abarca de Bolea, Count of Aranda (1718–1798), Spanish statesman and diplomat with Kings Charles III and Charles IV
 Gaspar Torrente (1888–1970), founder of the Aragonese political movement for regional autonomy
 José Antonio Labordeta (1935–2010), singer-songwriter and representative of the Aragonese party Chunta Aragonesista in the Spanish congress

Scientists

 Michael Servetus (1511–1553), physician, theologist and humanist
 Martín Sessé y Lacasta (1751–1808), botanist
 Santiago Ramón y Cajal (1852–1934), histologist and physician, Nobel laureate
 Fidel Pagés (1886–1923), surgeon, discoverer of epidural anesthesia
 Miguel A. Catalán (1894–1957), spectroscopist

Sociologists

 Domingo Tirado Benedí (1898–1971), educator

Athletes
 Víctor Muñoz (born 1957), football coach and former player
 Víctor Fernández (born 1960), football coach
 Alberto Belsúe (born 1968), football player

Writers
 Ramón José Sender (1901–1982)
 Baltasar Gracián (1601–1658), writer and thinker with a deep impact on Schopenhauer
 Jesús Moncada (1941–2005), Aragonese writer in Catalan language
 Miguel Labordeta (1921–1969), Aragonese poet
 Javier Sierra (born 1971), Aragonese bestseller writer and researcher

Other notables
Federico Jiménez Losantos (born 1951) controversial radio talk show hosts of Spain

 
Aragonese
Aragonese